New Era University College (NEUC) is a private, non-profit higher education institution  in Kajang, Selangor, Malaysia. It was founded on May 28, 1997.

NEUC is a LCCI Registered Training Centre (RTC), and also a Cisco Networking Academy, teaches students networking and other information technology-related courses such as CCNA (Cisco Certified Network Associate) and CCNP (Cisco Certified Network Professional).

History
Planning for the college started in earnest when a formal application for a College license was made in August 1994. After waiting for three years, the college was eventually approved by the Malaysian Education Ministry on 28 May 1997. The first intake of students at New Era College started their courses on 1 March 1998. 

It was officially upgraded into a university college on 10 January 2017.

Faculties
{
  "type": "ExternalData",
  "service": "geoshape",
  "ids": "Q17052678",
  "properties": {
    "title": "New Era University College",
    "description": "Campus",
  }
}

There are four faculties and ten departments under New Era University College:
 Faculty of Accountancy, Management and Economics (FAME)
 Department of Business Studies
 Department of Finance & Accounting
 Faculty of Computer Science and Information Computing Technology (FICT)
 Department of Information Computing Technology
 Faculty of Arts & Social Sciences (FASS)
 Department of Chinese Language & Literature
 Department of Education
 Department of Guidance & Counselling Psychology
 Department of Southeast Asian Studies
 Faculty of Media & Creative Arts (FMCA)
 Department of Art & Design
 Department of Drama & Visuals
 Department of Media Studies

New Era Institute of Vocational & Continuing Education (NEIVCE)
New Era University College owns New Era Institute of Vocational & Continuing Education (NEIVCE), which is a non-profit vocational college focus on vocational training. 

NEIVCE is accredited by Awards For Training & Higher Education (ATHE), Chung Chou University of Science and Technology, Qualifi and West College Scotland, and regulated by Office of Qualifications and Examinations Regulation (Ofqual).

Partner Institutions 

 China
Peking University
Zhejiang University
Renmin University of China
Communication University of China
South China University of Technology
Beijing Language and Culture University
Tianjin Normal University
Jilin University
Nanjing Normal University
Jiangnan University
Ningbo University
China Academy of Art
Wuhan University of Technology
Central China Normal University
East China Normal University
Jinan University
Chongqing Normal University
Hainan University
 Hong Kong
Lingnan University
 Taiwan
National Cheng Kung University
National Sun Yat-sen University
National Taiwan Normal University
National Chung Hsing University
National Taiwan University of Arts
National Hsinchu University of Education
National Chi Nan University
National Changhua University of Education
National Yunlin University of Science and Technology
Tamkang University
Feng Chia University
Chinese Culture University
Tunghai University
Shih Hsin University
Ming Chuan University
Yuan Ze University
Hsuan Chuang University
Chaoyang University of Technology
Asia University
Nanhua University
Tainan University of Technology
Shu-Te University
I-Shou University
Tajen University
Providence University
TransWorld University
 United Kingdom
Arden University
Buckinghamshire New University

See also
 List of universities in Malaysia

References

External links

New Era University College Official Website
New Era Institute of Vocational & Continuing Education Official Website

1997 establishments in Malaysia
Art schools in Malaysia
Business schools in Malaysia
Colleges in Malaysia
Design schools in Malaysia
Educational institutions established in 1997
Information technology schools in Malaysia
Kajang
Private universities and colleges in Malaysia
Universities and colleges in Selangor
Malaysian educational websites